Franz Aigner (born September 14, 1967) is a retired Austrian football player and a football manager currently managing SV Wals-Grünau.

Honours
 Austrian Football Bundesliga winner: 1994, 1995, 1997.
 Austrian Supercup winner: 1994, 1995, 1997.
 UEFA Cup finalist: 1994.
 Austrian Football Bundesliga runner-up: 1993.
 Austrian Cup finalist: 2000.

References

External links

1967 births
Living people
Austrian footballers
Austria international footballers
SK Sturm Graz players
FC Red Bull Salzburg players
FC Kärnten players
BSV Bad Bleiberg players
Austrian Football Bundesliga players
Association football midfielders
Austrian football managers